Dewar is a lunar impact crater that lies on the Moon's far side. Less than one crater diameter to the south-southwest is the crater Stratton. Vening Meinesz is a little over one crater diameter to the northwest. The slightly worn rim of this crater is roughly circular, with a small outward protrusion along the southern edge. The interior floor is marked by several small impacts along the eastern side.

Dewar lies on the south side of an anomalously low albedo area of terrain (dark patch) on the far side of the moon.  The low-albedo area is also a geochemical anomaly, and is high in iron oxide and titanium dioxide. It has been interpreted as a cryptomare.

Satellite craters
By convention these features are identified on lunar maps by placing the letter on the side of the crater midpoint that is closest to Dewar.

References

 
 
 
 
 
 
 
 
 
 
 
 

Impact craters on the Moon